Vittorio Rossi Pianelli (9 July 1875 – 25 September 1953) was an Italian stage and film actor and director. He was a prominent figure in early Italian film, appearing in over fifty silent films before 1930. His final appearance was in The Count of Brechard (1940).

A notable role was in Love Everlasting (1914). The film is one of the most important early Italian films. He also directed several films during the 1910s.

Selected filmography
Cesar Borgia (1912)
Love Everlasting (1913)
 Floretta and Patapon (1913)
Nerone e Agrippina (1918)
La moglie di Claudio (1918)
 Maciste the Policeman (1918)
 Hedda Gabler (1920)
 Latest Night News (1924)
The Count of Brechard (1940)

References

External links

Bibliography
Bayman, Louis & Rigoletto, Sergio. Popular Italian Cinema. Palgrave Macmillan, 2013.
Moliterno, Gino. Historical Dictionary of Italian Cinema. Scarecrow Press, 2008.

1875 births
1953 deaths
Italian film directors
Italian male film actors
Italian male silent film actors
Italian male stage actors
Film people from Turin
20th-century Italian male actors
Actors from Turin